Fred-René Øvergård Buljo (born 6 February 1988), better known as simply Fred Buljo, is a Norwegian Sámi rapper and joiker. Buljo is a member of the Sámi rap duo Duolva Duottar, consisting of Buljo and Ole Mahtte Gaup, established in 2007. In 2008 the group made a breakthrough when they participated in Norske Talenter and reached the final. He also is one of members of the Norwegian supergroup KEiiNO, alongside Alexandra Rotan and Tom Hugo, the group was created in late 2018 in preparation for the participation in Melodi Grand Prix 2019., they won the contest and so were selected to represent Norway in the 2019 Eurovision Contest, coming in 7th in the semifinals, and 6th in the final, with the song "Spirit in the Sky".

As well as being a musician, Buljo also has served in the Sami Parliament for the party Árja, first as a deputy from 2013 to 2016, and as an MP and parliamentary leader in the period 2016–2017.

Musical career

Since then, he has toured in the Nordic countries and Russia, and has worked both as a songwriter and as a performer. In 2019 he participated in the Melodi Grand Prix as part of the group KEiiNO and won with the song "Spirit in the Sky".

Political career
Buljo has also served as representative on the Sámi Parliament of Norway for the party Árja, first as a deputy from 2013 to 2016, and as an MP and parliamentary leader in the period 2016–2017.

Awards
In December 2019, Buljo beat Ella Marie Hætta Isaksen with 46.3% of the votes over her 32.87% to win Ávvir's Saami of the Year Award.

Discography

As part of Duolva Duottar

Albums 
  (2011)

Singles 
 "Álggu Loahppa (The End of the Beginning)" (2016)
 "Samestaten (State of Sapmi)" (2017)
 "Offroad" (2017)
 "Samegutt" (2017)
 "Joavnna" (2017)
 "Markanstallu" (2018)

As part of Keiino 
Albums

 "OKTA" (2020)

Singles 
 "Spirit in the Sky" (2019)
 “Shallow” (2019)
 "Praying" (2019)
"Monument" (2021)

References 

Living people
1988 births
Norwegian Sámi musicians
Norwegian musicians
Norwegian Sámi politicians
Norwegian Sámi people
Norwegian rappers
Members of the Sámi Parliament of Norway
People from Kautokeino
Melodi Grand Prix contestants
Eurovision Song Contest entrants of 2019